Jonathan Erlich and Aisam-ul-Haq Qureshi were the defending champions but chose not to participate together. Erlich played alongside James Cerretani, but lost in the first round to Guido Pella and João Sousa. Qureshi teamed up with Santiago González and lost in the semifinals to Ivan Dodig and Mate Pavić.

Dodig and Pavić went on to win the title, defeating Austin Krajicek and Jeevan Nedunchezhiyan in the final, 6–2, 6–4.

Seeds

Draw

Draw

References
 Main Draw

Chengdu Open - Doubles
2018 Doubles